The 1979 Avon Championships of Washington  was a women's tennis tournament played on indoor carpet courts (Sporteze) at the GWU Charles Smith Center and the Capital Centre in Washington D.C., District of Columbia in the United States that was part of the 1979 Avon Championships Circuit. It was the eighth edition of the tournament and was held from January 1 through January 7, 1979. Second-seeded Tracy Austin won the singles title and earned $24,000 first-prize money.

Finals

Singles
 Tracy Austin defeated  Martina Navratilova 6–3, 6–2
 It was Tracy's first singles title of the year and the fourth of her career.

Doubles
 Mima Jaušovec /  Virginia Ruzici defeated  Renée Richards /  Sharon Walsh 4–6, 6–2, 6–4

Prize money

References

External links
 Women's Tennis Association (WTA) tournament edition details
 International Tennis Federation (ITF) tournament edition details

Avon Championships of Washington
Virginia Slims of Washington
1979 in sports in Washington, D.C.
Virgin